The Townsend House is a historic late First Period house in Needham, Massachusetts, United States. The -story wood-frame house was built in 1720 by Gregory Sugars, a sea captain, for his son-in-law, Rev. Jonathan Townsend. The building has retained little external appearance as an early 18th century house, showing the adaptive reuse and restyling of older houses. It was given a Federal appearance in the 1780s by its second owner, Rev. Samuel West, and was, under his ownership, used as a muster site for the local militia prior to the 1775 Battles of Lexington and Concord. The building has been much modified over the years (including the addition of a mansard-like roof), but many of its older interior rooms have retained features from the 18th century.

The house was listed on the National Register of Historic Places in 1982.

See also
National Register of Historic Places listings in Norfolk County, Massachusetts

References

National Register of Historic Places in Norfolk County, Massachusetts
Houses completed in 1720
Houses in Needham, Massachusetts
1720 establishments in Massachusetts